Karen Bowerman is an English journalist, television presenter, filmmaker and travel writer who has worked for Sky News, ITV, CNN International and the BBC. Formerly the Consumer Correspondent for BBC 1, and the Business and Consumer Presenter for the BBC News Channel and BBC World, she is now freelance, specialising in travel, consumer stories and personal finance.

She is a presenter and film maker for the BBC's Travel Show on BBC 2 and BBC World, works for The Press Association and contributes to the Independent, the Mail on Sunday, the Express, CNN.com and National Geographic Traveller. When not on assignment she is a corporate presenter.

Education
Bowerman was an Academic Scholar at St Hugh's College, Oxford. She has a BA (Hons) and MA in Theology. After her first degree she was offered a place at Wolfson College, Oxford, to study for a PhD in Theology but had to defer for a year to try to secure funding. During this time she began working for a local paper.

Career
After a brief spell in regional newspapers and TV, Bowerman became a BBC News Trainee, passed various law exams for journalists, and went on to report and present for BBC South West, Sky News and CNN International.

BBC News
In 2002 Bowerman was offered a job as the Consumer Correspondent for the BBC News at One, BBC News at Six and the BBC News at Ten where she specialised in undercover filming and special investigations. In 2006, she became the Business & Consumer Presenter for the BBC News Channel while also reporting for BBC Radio 4 & News reading for Radio 5 Live.

Programmes
After establishing herself in News, Bowerman worked as a contributor and presenter for BBC programmes. Stints included Weekend Watchdog, Newsnight, Fast:track (now The Travel Show) on BBC 2 and the Heaven and Earth Show on BBC 1. She presented several series of BBC Northern Ireland's Watchdog, Fair Play, on BBC1, where some of her undercover investigations led to convictions.

She also conceived and co-produced Test the Nation's Morals, a live show broadcast by BBC Religion which gave birth to a national equivalent.

Films and Documentaries
Since 2009 Bowerman has worked as a freelance travel reporter and film maker for the BBC's News Features department. She produces, shoots and presents her own material. Her short travel films have won several awards.

Work has taken her to the Arctic and Antarctic where she has made documentaries for TV and BBC Radio 4. Projects have included sailing a replica Phoenician ship round Africa, travelling in India with the grandson of Gandhi, navigating the North West Passage in the footsteps of Shackleton and rafting the rapids of the Grand Canyon.

Awards
Bowerman twice won "Travel Broadcaster of the Year" in the former UK Travel Press Awards, gaining recognition for films she shot and produced herself. She has been short-listed for, and won, various gongs since. Some are listed below:

"Best Cruise Broadcast 2015" Cruise Line Industry Association; 
"Best National Newspaper Travel Feature on Germany 2015" (Runner-up), German Tourist Board; 
"Best Regional Newspaper Travel Feature 2015" (Finalist), Travel Media Awards; 
"Best National (Magazine) Travel Feature 2014" (Finalist), UK Travel Awards; 
"Best Regional Travel Feature 2013" British Travel Press Awards; 
"Travel Broadcaster of the Year 2012" (portfolio of short films) UK Travel Press Awards; 
"Best Regional Travel Feature 2012" British Travel Press Awards; 
"Specialist Journalist Award 2012 (Travel)" British Regional Press Awards; 
"Travel Broadcast Journalist of the Year 2011" (Runner-Up), British Guild of Travel Writers;  
"Travel Broadcaster of the Year 2010" (portfolio of short films) UK Travel Press Awards; 
"Travel Broadcaster of the Year 2009" (Runner-Up), UK Travel Press Awards.

Corporate work
Bowerman hosts international conferences, leads panel discussions and acts as a presenter for various corporate projects. Clients have included the UN, Mercedes, Hitachi, Danone, Swiss Re, Saga, Farnborough Air Show, the International Telecommunication Union and supermarkets.

The wrong Guy
Bowerman's infamous claim to fame was interviewing the "wrong guy", Guy Goma, on BBC News in 2006. Goma was an applicant for an IT job who thought the interview was a bizarre BBC process. The BBC said Bowerman sensed something was not right but that in the frantic environment of live news her editor did not hear her. In the end she was told to keep the man talking while producers scrambled to find another guest. Bowerman's editor said she "deserved a medal" for her good humoured handling of the affair.

References

BBC newsreaders and journalists
BBC World News
Living people
Year of birth missing (living people)